Howard Arthur "Mul" Holland was a Major League Baseball pitcher. He played parts of three seasons in the majors, each with a different team.

University of Virginia

Football
Holland was a prominent tackle for the Virginia Cavaliers of the University of Virginia. Greasy Neale rated him with the best he ever coached.

1925
He was selected All-Southern  in 1925.

Basketball
He also played basketball.

1925
After the SoCon tournament, Holland was selected for the 1925 All-Tournament team among tournament champion Jack Cobb.

Baseball
He was a pitcher on the baseball team.

Sources

Major League Baseball pitchers
Cincinnati Reds players
New York Giants (NL) players
St. Louis Cardinals players
Fairmont Black Diamonds players
Clarksburg Generals players
Houston Buffaloes players
Baseball players from Virginia
Virginia Cavaliers baseball players
1903 births
1969 deaths
American football tackles
Virginia Cavaliers football players
All-Southern college football players
People from Franklin, Virginia